Kardomia  is a  genus of flowering plants in the family Myrtaceae. The genus was first formally described in 2007 and includes species previously included in Baeckea and Babingtonia. The entire genus is native to northeastern Australia (States of New South Wales and Queensland)

species
 Kardomia granitica (A.R.Bean) Peter G.Wilson 	  
 Kardomia jucunda (S.T.Blake) Peter G.Wilson  	  
 Kardomia odontocalyx (A.R.Bean) Peter G.Wilson  	  
 Kardomia prominens (A.R.Bean) Peter G.Wilson  	  
 Kardomia silvestris (A.R.Bean) Peter G.Wilson  	  
 Kardomia squarrulosa (Domin) Peter G.Wilson

References

Myrtaceae
Myrtaceae genera
Endemic flora of Australia
Flora of Queensland
Flora of New South Wales